The Midland Highway (also known as the Midlands Highway) is one of Tasmania's major inter-city highways, running for  between Hobart and Launceston. It is part of the AusLink National Network and is a vital link for road freight to transport goods to and from the two cities.
It represents a major north–south transportation corridor in Tasmania and has the route 1 designation as part of the National Highway.
The highway consists of various traffic lane arrangements, the most common being two lanes – one in each direction, with overtaking options and at-grade intersections. At both the Launceston and Hobart sections of the highway there are small portions of grade-separated dual carriageway.

History

Surveyor Grimes marked out the track from Hobart to Launceston in 1807, and Governor Macquarie followed the route in 1811 when he visited the colony accompanied by his wife. The party took five and a half days to complete the journey.

Macquarie again visited the colony in 1821, when the road was fit for a carriage, but his journal records many different sections, and it was not until 1831 that the first regular coach service was operated by J. E. Cox.

The first mailman, Robert Taylor, was appointed in 1816, he walked, leaving Hobart and Launceston on alternate Sundays and carrying the mail in a pack.

The first record of movement between the two centres was in 1821 when then Governor Lachlan Macquarie selected sites for towns on the highway.

It was known as the "Main Road" or "Hobart Road" for most of its history.  In the 1930s it became known as the Midland Highway, and in the 2000s - it also had "The Heritage Highway" label applied to it.

The route of the highway originally ran between Hobart and Launceston, and passed through the localities which are now known as:
Bridgewater, Brighton, Pontville, Mangalore, Bagdad, Dysart, Kempton, Melton Mowbray, Jericho, Oatlands, Antill Ponds, Woodbury, Tunbridge, Ross, Campbell Town, Conara Junction, Cleveland, Epping Forest, Perth, Breadalbane and Kings Meadows.

Recent upgrades

A number of two lane bypasses of towns and villages have been constructed since the early 1980s, including the Jericho bypass, which was opened to traffic in January 1982.

Construction of grade separated dual carriageways leading south of Launceston and north of Hobart provided new superior facilities for Midland Highway traffic and shortened the route officially designated the Midland Highway.

On 21 June 1983, what was then referred to as the "Hobart Northern Outlet Road" was opened to traffic. Now called the Brooker Highway, this completed a grade-separated dual carriageway between Claremont Interchange and Granton in the northern suburbs of Hobart.

Construction of the first stage of the Launceston Southern Outlet between Glen Dhu and Strathroy commenced in February 1981 and comprised the construction of 7.4 km of dual carriageway and included three major bridges, namely the Mt Pleasant Interchange, the Westbury Road Overpass and the Glen Dhu Overpass. The highway opened to traffic between the Glen Dhu interchange and the temporary connection onto the old Midland Highway at Jinglers Creek, Strathroy.
The extension of the Launceston Southern Outlet Road between Breadalbane and Strathroy opened to traffic on 28 August 1987. This extension included the construction of 3.7 km of dual carriageway and a roundabout, linking the Outlet Road with the Midland Highway and Evandale Main Road.
The third and final section of the Launceston Southern Outlet opened to traffic on 24 May 1988. The road works involved construction of 1 km of dual carriageway between Glen Dhu Overpass and the Frankland Street/Wellington Street intersection.

In October 2012, the Brighton Bypass was officially opened, six months ahead of schedule. This bypass is a grade separated dual carriageway of the towns of Brighton and Pontville, just beyond Hobart’s northern suburbs. The total cost of the bypass was A$191 million.

On 16 April 2020, the second and final stage of the Perth Link Roads project was officially completed over 3 years ahead of schedule, including the opening of the long-overdue bypass of Perth. The bypass consists of 4.5 km of dual carriageway, including a grade separated interchange with Illawarra Road, an interchange consisting of two roundabouts north of the Perth, and a roundabout south of the town centre, near the South Esk River bridge. Stage 1 of the project was completed in April 2018, including a new grade separated interchange at Breadalbane to bypass the existing roundabout which provides connections with Launceston Airport, Evandale and the old Midland Highway alignment to Youngtown and Kings Meadows. A new dual carriageway alignment was also constructed alongside the existing highway to connect the new Breadalbane interchange with the Perth bypass.

In 2002, a railway line underpass was constructed near Symmons Plains, south of Perth, to create a grade separated rail crossing on the highway itself.  Significant numbers of overtaking lanes have also been extended or created.

Future
There has been mounting pressure for the Highway to be upgraded to a four-lane carriageway for 20 years to fall in line with the Auslink network of highways such as the Hume and Pacific as it is Tasmania's most heavily travelled stretch of long highway.

The State and federal Liberal Parties have pledged $400 million to the funding of a dual-carriageway highway between Hobart and Launceston. The Australian Labor Party stated that the 400 million-dollar budget is grossly underfunded, and could not possibly be constructed for that price.

The Liberal Party defended the accusations that the $3 million/km budget is too low by stating that they are not planning any new road alignments or bypasses, just adding new lanes to the existing alignment. They have not stated if they plan to include grade separation or T-junctions and roundabouts. Should both the federal and state Liberal Parties win the next elections, they plan to upgrade this remaining stretch of road from 2014 progressively.

Currently, there are several projects/proposals;

Brighton

The  bypass on the southern stretch of the Highway was recently opened as part of the Southern Transport Investment Program, A Transport masterplan for the southern part of the Highway. The Transport study also caters for the Bagdad Bypass and the replacement of the ageing Bridgewater Bridge

Perth
The Perth Bypass is proposed to be constructed in 2 stages starting with the South Perth bypass which will result in a direct route to Illawarra Main Road - a vital link road to the Bass Highway. There are also plans to Duplicate the Midland Highway Between Perth and Launceston.

See also

 Highways in Australia
 List of highways in Tasmania
 Southern Transport Investment Program
 Brighton Transport Hub

Notes

References
 Alexander, Alison (2005) The Midland Highway in Alexander, A. Ed. The Companion to Tasmanian History. Hobart. Centre for Tasmanian Historical Studies. 

Highways in Australia
Highways in Tasmania
Highways in Hobart
Midlands (Tasmania)